René Morax (11 May 1873 – 3 January 1963) was a Swiss writer, playwright, stage director and theatre manager. He founded the Théâtre du Jorat in Morges in 1908, and promoted historical and rural theatre in French in Switzerland. He is known for the play Le Roi David, with music by Arthur Honegger.

Early life and career 
Born in Morges, Canton de Vaud, on 11 May 1873, Morax studied literature in Lausanne, Paris and Berlin. His first play, La Nuit des quatre-temps (1901) was given at the casino in Morges. This show gave a new direction to the culture in Switzerland. Indeed, following the example of what was done in France, this was the first expression of a true form of popular theater.

In 1903, he premiered La Dîme at Mézières. This drama, based on a historical fact, well known in the region, tells the story of Pastor Martin who in 1790 was thrown into prison because he disputed the fact that the peasants must pay a direct tax on potatoes. La Dîme was a tremendous success and received international attention. The improvised stage for the performances was made permanent, and thus he created in 1908 the Théâtre du Jorat, together with his brother Jean. It was soon nicknamed the "Sublime Barn" (La Grange sublime).

A notable inspiration of the Jorat theater, René Morax wrote, staged and played rural and historical dramas in French. In 1910, he premiered Aliéno, written in collaboration with Gustave Doret, then in 1921 the oratorio Le Roi David with a then unknown composer, Arthur Honegger. The text, based on biblical narration, tells the story of King David from his time as a shepherd boy to his death. Morax wrote the text for a 1928 cantata by Conrad Beck, Der Tod des Oedipus.

René Morax was also the author of little comedies and farces (including Les Quatre Doigts et le Pouce in 1915, revived by the Théâtre des Faux-Nez in 1955), and of translations and adaptations which made him one of the most productive contemporary theater dramatists in Switzerland.

Theatre work
 1902: Les quatre doigts et le pouce.
 1903: La Dime, music by Alexandre Dénéréaz
 1908: Henriette.
 1910: Aliénor, music by Gustave Doret
 1911: Orphée.
 1912: La nuit des Quatre Temps.
 1914: Tell.
 1921: Le Roi David, biblical drama, music by Arthur Honegger.
 1923: Davel.
 1925: Judith.
 1929 Roméo et Juliette (translation after Shakespeare).
 1931: La belle de Moudon.
 1933: La terre et l’eau.
 1937: La Servante d’Évolène, music by Gustave Doret
 1944: Charles le téméraire.
 1947 La lampe d’argile.

Later life and death
Morax was awarded the Dramenpreis (drama prize) of the foundation Welti-Stiftung in 1942. A bust in his honour was inaugurated in Morges on 17 June 1962 in his presence. He died in the hospital of his hometown on 3 January 1963.

References

Further reading

Sources 
 René Morax on theaterwissenschaft.ch
 Fonds : René Morax (1901–1968) [0,70 mètres linéaires]. Cote: CH-000053-1 P Morax.  read online
 .
 A contre temps huitante textes vaudois de 1980 à 1380, (pp. 160–165), 
 P.-Ol. Walzer Dictionnaire des littératures suisses, (p. 409), 
 H.-Ch.Dahlem Sur les pas d'un lecteur heureux, (p. 423), 
 R. Francillon Histoire de la littérature en Suisse romande, vol. 2, (pp. 323–326), (pp. 334–336), 
 A. Nicollier, H.-Ch. Dahlem Dictionnaire des écrivains suisses d'expression française, vol. 2, (pp. 605–606), 
 Dessin photographie d'une coupe du théâtre de René Morax, à Mézières, photographie Arthur Buttel, Ferlens Patrie suisse, (René Morax) 1908, No 379, (pp. 83–84)
 Photo Thibault, Morges Patrie suisse, (E. de B.), 1902, No 216, (pp. 5–8)
 Pierre Meylan: René Morax et son temps.

External links 
 
 René Morax: Un théâtre pour le peuple. (PDF; 1,1 MB) Exposition au Musée Alexis Forel de Morges
 Morax raconte, audio-interview (11 April 1958) on Archives de la RTS

Swiss dramatists and playwrights
20th-century dramatists and playwrights
1873 births
People from Morges
1963 deaths